Tindi may refer to:
 Tindi people, an indigenous people of the Caucasus
 Tindi language, their language
 Tindi, Estonia, a village in Estonia